Pedro Jacobo Contreras (born October 10, 1955) is a semi-retired Mexican Luchador or professional wrestler best known under the ring name Cachorro Mendoza. Cachorro Mendoza means "Cub Mendoza" in English and refers to the fact that he is the youngers of the Mendoza brothers Ringo, Indio and Freddy all of whom are Luchadors. Over the years he's worked extensively for Empresa Mexicana de Lucha Libre (EMLL) and the Universal Wrestling Association (UWA), often teaming with his brothers, especially Ringo Mendoza. The Mendoza brothers have held the Mexican National Tag Team Championship on one occasion, and he has also held the Mexican National Middleweight Championship, the NWA World Middleweight Championship and the UWA World Middleweight Championship during his career. Cotreras briefly worked as Máscara Sagrada on the Mexican Independent circuit, using the outfit and name of the original Máscara Sagrada without permission. He retired from professional wrestling in the late 1990s but returned to the ring in 2009 to team with his brother Ringo Mendoza on a series of shows promoted by International Wrestling Revolution Group (IWRG).

Championships and accomplishments
Empresa Mexicana de Lucha Libre
Mexican National Middleweight Championship (1 time)
Mexican National Tag Team Championship (1 time) – with Ringo Mendoza
NWA World Middleweight Championship (1 time)
Copa Arena Coliseo (1994) – with Bestia Salvaje
Universal Wrestling Association
UWA World Middleweight Championship (1 time)

Luchas de Apuestas record

Notes

References

1955 births
Mexican male professional wrestlers
Professional wrestlers from Jalisco
Living people
Mexican National Middleweight Champions
Mexican National Tag Team Champions
20th-century professional wrestlers
21st-century professional wrestlers
NWA World Middleweight Champions
UWA World Middleweight Champions